Barsø is a small populated island which is part of the Aabenraa municipality (Danish, kommune) in South Jutland County on the east coast of the Jutland peninsula in south Denmark. It has a car ferry connection to the mainland.

See also
 Nearby islands: Als, Funen, Bågø, Lyø, Drejø.
 Nearby cities: Aabenraa, Sønderborg.

Notes

References
 Tageo.com, "VESTSJAELLAND DENMARK Geography Population" (coordinates), 2007, webpage: Tageo-index.
 Denmark Postal codes, webpage: Postnumre-DK.
 Tele.dk Denmark detailed road map, webpage: Tele-DK-Danmark.

External links 

Islands of Denmark
Geography of Aabenraa Municipality